Allan Hunt (born February 12, 1945) is an American actor, probably best remembered as Crewman Stuart Riley from season 2 of ABC's Voyage to the Bottom of the Sea.

Biography
Hunt trained at the Pasadena Playhouse, UCLA, American Conservatory Theater, and Seattle Repertory. After several small parts in his younger years he was cast in the second season of Voyage to the Bottom of the Sea. He almost didn't get the part because Irwin Allen didn't like the idea of having another regular character who was taller than the series' lead actor Richard Basehart (who was 5' 8"). During season two with heightening tension in Vietnam Allan realized that he would be drafted, so rather than take his chances with the draft, he enlisted in the Marine Corps. He trained as a US Marine at Marine Corps Air Station El Toro, then was transferred to Special Services with the US Army. During his time in Vietnam, Allan was responsible for USO shows, wrote special material and hosted and directed live stage shows. Irwin Allen promised to keep the role of Stu Riley for Allan when he completed his duties in the Army, but by the time he finished his time in Vietnam, the show had finished so he wasn't able to resume the role of Riley. Over the years Allan has worked in many different areas; a lot of work on stage (as an actor and director), as a Regular for 2 years on General Hospital, work as a news anchor for CBS affiliate KGGM in Albuquerque, New Mexico, in 1987 and more recently back on TV in shows such as Love Boat: The Next Wave and Charmed.

Partial filmography
Dennis the Menace (TV) (Dennis at Boot Camp) (1962)
Gunsmoke  (TV) (Lover Boy) (1963) .... Boy
  My Three Sons (TV) (Almost the Sound of Music) (1963)... Dennis
Dr. Kildare (TV) (The Child Between) (1964) .... Rusty
Karen (TV) (No Boys Allowed) (1964) .... Roger
Perry Mason (TV) (2 episodes) (1963–1964)
The Munsters (TV) (Bats of a Feather) (1965) .... The 2nd G.I.
The Donna Reed Show (TV) (3 episodes) (1962–1965)
Voyage to the Bottom of the Sea (TV) (2nd Season Regular Character) (1965–1966) .... Stuart Riley
Ironside (TV) (Trip to Hashbury) (1968) .... Gary
Freaky Friday (1976) .... Car Cop (uncredited)
Miss Jones (TV) (1991) .... 2nd Attorney
Love Boat: The Next Wave (TV) (Captains Courageous) (1998) .... Piano Player
Charmed (TV) (Feats of Clay) (1999) .... Auctioneer

Stage Work
Actor
Pleasure of His Company (with Lana Turner and Louis Jourdan)
Your Own Thing
Our Town (with Henry Fonda)
Richard II (with Richard Chamberlain)
Forty Carats (with June Lockhart)
Everybody's Girl (with Rose Marie)

Director
The Caine Mutiny Court-Martial
Hello, Dolly!
That Championship Season
The Boys in Autumn (with Walter Koenig and Mark Lenard)
The Student Prince
Pirates of Penzance
A Christmas Carol (Robert Hayes, Walter Koenig, Edd Hall)

Awards
Three Drama-Logue Awards:

The Caine Mutiny Court-Martial (1981)
Hello Dolly (1983)
That Championship Season (1988)

References

External links
 
 Official Website
 "Allan Hunt as Seaman Stu Riley" at vttbots.com
 School Website

1945 births
American male film actors
American male television actors
American male stage actors
American theatre directors
University of California, Los Angeles alumni
Living people